The Gas-au-lec was an American automobile manufactured by Corwin Manufacturing Company of Peabody, Massachusetts.

During 1905 and 1906, Corwin produced this five-place side-entrance tourer with a copper-jacketed four-cylinder four-cycle gasoline (petrol) engine of 40-45 hp (30-34 kW). The company's ads claimed it lacked starting crank, "change speed gears", clutch, cams, valve gear, tappets, and complications, thanks to  electromagnetically operated inlet valves. Only about four were made.

Advertisements

References

Sources
Clymer, Floyd. Treasury of Early American Automobiles, 1877-1925. New York: Bonanza Books, 1950.
David Burgess Wise, The New Illustrated Encyclopedia of Automobiles

See also
List of automobile manufacturers
List of defunct automobile manufacturers

Brass Era vehicles
Defunct motor vehicle manufacturers of the United States
1900s cars
Companies based in Peabody, Massachusetts
Defunct companies based in Massachusetts